Johnny Huang may refer to:

Wenguan Johnny Huang (born 1962), Chinese-born Canadian table tennis player
Huang Jingyu (born 1992), Chinese actor

See also
John Huang (born 1945), Chinese-born American criminal and fundraiser for the Democratic National Committee